Prirechny is a rural locality (an inhabited locality) in Pechengsky District of Murmansk Oblast, Russia, located beyond the Arctic Circle at a height of  above sea level. Population: 45 (2010 Census).

References

Notes

Sources

Rural localities in Murmansk Oblast